Juan Antonio Ramos Sánchez (born 18 August 1976 in Barcelona) is a Spanish taekwondo practitioner.

He is a two-time world champion, winning the finweight title in 1997 and the flyweight title in 2007.  He also competed for Spain at the 2004 and 2008 Olympic Games, finishing fourth and equal fifth respectively. He is married to Brigitte Yagüe, also successful in taekwondo. He was a coach at the 2012 Olympic Games for Anthony Obame of Gabon, where Obame won Silver medal in men's heavyweight.

Now Ramos is the French national team coach.

References

Spanish male taekwondo practitioners
Taekwondo practitioners at the 2004 Summer Olympics
Taekwondo practitioners at the 2008 Summer Olympics
Olympic taekwondo practitioners of Spain
Sportspeople from Barcelona
1976 births
Living people
World Taekwondo Championships medalists
20th-century Spanish people
21st-century Spanish people